Pleromidae is a family of oceanic sea sponges.

Genera 
Anaderma Lévi & Lévi, 1983
Pleroma Sollas 1888

References
 

Tetractinellida
Taxa named by William Johnson Sollas